Nicolas Le Messurier is an English sound engineer. He has been nominated for three Academy Awards in the category Best Sound. He has worked on more than 150 films since 1968.

Selected filmography
 Superman (1978)
 A Passage to India (1984)
 Aliens (1986)

References

External links

Year of birth missing (living people)
Living people
British audio engineers
Best Sound BAFTA Award winners